Ecclesiam Suam is an encyclical of Pope Paul VI on  the Catholic Church given at St. Peter's, Rome, on the Feast of the Transfiguration,  6 August 1964, the second year of his Pontificate. It is considered an important document, which identified the Catholic Church with  the Body of Christ.

Pope Paul called the Church  founded by Jesus Christ  as a loving mother of all men. In light of the ongoing Vatican Council he did not want to offer new insights or doctrinal definitions. He asked for  a deeper self-knowledge, renewal and dialogue.  He also states that the Church itself was engulfed and shaken by a tidal wave of change, and was deeply affected by the climate of the world.

Content 
Paul VI quotes the encyclical Mystici Corporis of Pope Pius XII, as a key document:

Paul VI considers Mystici Corporis,  the doctrine of the Church as Mystical Body of Christ,  timely and urgent and relevant to the needs of the Church in his day. A richer understanding of the Mystical Body,  will result in a better view of its  theological and spiritual  significance.

This statement was  important, when the Council defined the Church to subsist in the Body of Christ, rather than to be the Body of Christ, as Pius XII and all Popes before him had taught.  A potential reversal of a vital  teaching of the reigning Pope Paul VI, would have  surely been noted inside and outside the Church at the time.  Therefore, the  phrase "subsists in" of Vatican II, is interpreted as not to undermine the identity of the "Church of Christ" and the "Catholic Church".  John XXIII argued this point, when he opened Vatican II, "The Council … wishes to transmit Catholic doctrine, whole and entire, without alteration or deviation."

In Ecclesiam suam, Paul VI  invited separated  Churches to  unity, stating that the continued papacy is essential for any unity, because without it, in the words of Jerome: "There would be as many schisms in the Church as there are priests." In this encyclical, Paul VI  attempted to present the  Marian teachings of the Church in view of her new ecumenical orientation. Ecclesiam suam called the Virgin Mary the ideal of Christian perfection. Pope Paul VI regarded "devotion to the Mother of God as of paramount importance in living the life of the Gospel."

References 

Papal encyclicals
Catholic ecclesiology
Documents of Pope Paul VI
1964 in Christianity
1964 documents
August 1964 events in Europe